Miss Philippines Earth 2013 was the 13th edition of the Miss Philippines Earth pageant. It was held on May 19, 2013 at the Mall of Asia Arena in Pasay, Philippines. Stephany Dianne Stefanowitz of Quezon City crowned Angelee Claudette delos Reyes of Olongapo at the end of the event. Delos Reyes represented the Philippines at the Miss Earth 2013 pageant and placed Top 8. The pageant has aligned itself with the 2013 declaration of the United Nations General Assembly as the "International Year of Water Cooperation." It was also the first in pageant history to use a hologram technology.

Results
Color keys

Special Awards

Pre-pageant activities

Challenge Events

Most Enthusiastics Learner 
The winners are:

Make-up Challenge 
The event was sponsored by Ever- Bilena Cosmetics. The winners are:

Best in Dance 
The winners are:

Swimsuit Competition 
The winners are:

Resorts Wear Competition 
Miss Philippines Earth candidates competed for the Resorts Wear Category at Pontefino Hotel last April 12, 2013. The winners are:

Storytelling Contest 
Miss Philippines Earth candidates competed for storytelling challenge at SM Storyland at SM City Fairview. The winners are:

Cooking Contest 
Miss Philippines Earth candidates were formed into groups to compete for cooking challenge at SM Hypermarket at SM City Fairview. The event was sponsored by Bounty Fresh. The winners are:

Cultural Wear Contest 
Miss Philippines Earth candidates competed for cultural wear contest at SMDC. The winners are:

Darlings of the Press 
The winners are:

Trivia Challenge 
The winners are:

Talent 
The winners are:

Evening Gown Challenge 
The winners are:

Photogenic 
The winners are:

Catwalk Challenge 
The winners are:

Delegates
The following is the list of the 48 official delegates of Miss Philippines Earth 2013 representing various cities, municipalities, provinces, and Filipino communities abroad:

Judges
 Arnold Vegafria – Talent manager, Owner of ALV Talent Circuit
 Laurence Peña – General Manager of F1 Hotel Manila
 Agnes Roscigno – Wife of H.E. Massimo Roscigno – Ambassador Extraordinary and Plenipotentiary of the Embassy of the Republic of Italy
 Michael Cinco – Dubai-based Filipino fashion designer
 Commissioner Naderev Saño – Undersecretary of Climate Change Commission
 Michael Carandang – International TV producer
 Iya Villania – Movie and TV personality, commercial model
 H.E. Josef Rychtar – Ambassador of the Embassy of Czech Republic
 Gina Lopez – Executive Director of ABS-CBN Foundation, Inc., Chairperson of Pasig River Rehabilitation Commission
|}

References

External links
 Miss Philippines-Earth official website

2013
2013 beauty pageants
2013 in the Philippines